XHGON-FM is a radio station on 92.9 FM in Ciudad Obregón, Sonora. The station is owned by Radio S.A. and carries a grupera format known as La Kaliente.

History
XHGON received its concession on August 7, 1992. It was owned by Roberto Torres García. In March 2004, Torres García sold the station to Radio S.A.

Until late 2021 the station was known as Grupera and became La Kaliente in 2022.

References

Radio stations in Sonora
Radio stations established in 1992